Number Assignment Module (NAM) - The NAM is the electronic memory in the cellular phone that stores the telephone number, International mobile subscriber identity and an Electronic Serial Number. Phones with dual- or multi-NAM features offer users the option of registering the phone with a local number in more than one market.

Mobile technology